Lowcza may refer to the following places in Poland:
Łowcza, Lublin Voivodeship (east Poland)
Łówcza, Subcarpathian Voivodeship (south-east Poland)